Tulno  is a village in the administrative district of Gmina Pasłęk, within Elbląg County, Warmian-Masurian Voivodeship, in northern Poland. As of 2021, only one person lives in the village.

References

Tulno